Danabari is a town and Village Development Committee  in Ilam District in the Province No. 1 of eastern Nepal. At the time of the 2011 Nepal census it had a population of 14302 persons living in 1492 individual households.

Education

College, +2 Level and Schools
 Garuwa Multiple Campus
 Kankai Higher Secondary School (est. 2017 B.S.)
 Yuwa Barsha Secondary School
 New Light Secondary School
 SM Academy
 Shree Nepal Academy
 Laxmi Adarsha Secondary School
 Deep Jyoti Primary School, Katteltar 
 Garuwa Primary School, Sukrabare etc.

References

External links
UN map of the municipalities of Ilam District

Populated places in Ilam District